John Sheridan (May 18, 1856 – January 13, 1932) was a Canadian politician. He served in the Legislative Assembly of New Brunswick from 1908 to 1917 as an Independent member.

References 

1856 births
1932 deaths